Vincent Jones may refer to:

Vincent Jones (musician), Canadian musician
Vince Jones (born 1954), jazz musician
Vince Jones (politician) (1910–1971), member of the Queensland Legislative Assembly
Vincent Jones (One Life to Live), a fictional character on the US soap opera One Life to Live
Vinnie Jones (born 1965), actor and ex-footballer